Soccer in South Australia is organised by Football Federation of South Australia (FFSA) who organise local competitions.  FFSA is a member of Football Federation Australia

National representation
South Australia has one team in the A-League named Adelaide United.  Adelaide United also have associated youth and women's teams in the National Youth League and W-League.  South Australia was previously represented in the now defunct National Soccer League by Adelaide City and West Adelaide, who have historically faced off in the Adelaide derby. The two sides now compete in the National Premier Leagues South Australia.

Federation Cup

The Federation Cup is a knock-out competition for South Australian clubs. Since 2014 the Federation Cup winner also qualifiers to participate in the national FFA Cup.

Clubs and leagues
The highest South Australian league is the National Premier Leagues South Australia (NPL SA).  Since 2013 The winner of this competition plays off against the winners of the NPL conferences from other states in a national finals series to determine the NPL Champion.

Below the NPL SA in order are the SA State League 1 and SA State League 2.

National Premier Leagues South Australia
Adelaide City
Adelaide Comets
Adelaide Olympic
Adelaide United Youth
Campbelltown City
Croydon Kings
Cumberland United
North Eastern MetroStars
South Adelaide
West Adelaide
West Torrens Birkalla
White City FC Beograd

South Australian State League 1
Adelaide Blue Eagles
Adelaide Hills Hawks
Adelaide Croatia Raiders
Adelaide Victory
Cumberland United
Fulham United
Modbury Jets
Adelaide Vipers
Para Hills Knights
Playford City Patriots
Seaford Rangers FC
Sturt Lions
Western Strikers
White City

South Australian State League 2

Adelaide Cobras
Adelaide Vipers
Salisbury United
Noarlunga United
Eastern United
Gawler SC
Modbury Vista
Mount Barker United
Port Adelaide Pirates
The Cove
Northern Demons
Pontian Eagles

Below are leagues based in South Australia outside of the NPL system.

Limestone Coast Football Association
Apollo Mount Gambier Soccer Club
Blue Lake Soccer Club
Gambier Centrals Soccer Club
International Mount Gambier Soccer Club
Millicent United Soccer Club
Naracoorte United Soccer Club

Riverland Soccer Association
Barmera United Soccer Club
Berri River Rangers Soccer Club
Loxton United Soccer Club
Renmark Olympic Soccer Club

Collegiate Soccer League
Adelaide Comets
Adelaide Hills Hawks
Adelaide Thunder Football Club
Adelaide Uni Grads Blue
Adelaide Uni Grads Red
Adelaide Uni SC Black
Adelaide Uni SC White
Adelaide Victory FC
Blackwood High School Forest SC
Campbelltown City Soccer club
Cardijn College
Christian Brothers College FC
Concordia Old Collegians Soccer Club
Cumberland United SC
Flinders University SC 
Fulham United SC
Hahndorf Soccer Club
Immanuel Old Scholars
Mercedes Old Collegians
Mount Barker United Soccer Club
Norwood Soccer Club
North City Panthers
Pembroke Old Scholars Soccer Club
Plympton Bulldogs SC
Pulteney Grammar Crabs
Rostrevor Old Collegians
Sacred Heart Old Collegians
Saint Pauls Old Scholars Soccer Club
Scotch College
Sturt Lions 
Thebarton Senior College
Uni SA FC
Unley Old Scholars FC
Westminster Knights
Windsor Gardens
Woodside Warriors

Port Lincoln Soccer Association
Lincoln City
Lincoln Knights
Sekol Masters
South Coast

South Australian Amateur Soccer League
Adelaide Budapest
Adelaide Cobras
Adelaide Croatia
Adelaide Great Wall
Adelaide Khukuri Football Club
Adelaide Pumas
Adelaide Red Stars Soccer Club
Adelaide Redblue Eagles
Adelaide Titans
Adelaide University
Adelaide Vikings
Adelaide Villa
Adelaide Wanderers
Aldinga Sharks
Andrews Farm Hornets
Angle Vale
Athelstone
Barossa United Tigers
Bosa
Brahma Lodge
Burundi Eagles Soccer Club
Chin Utd Soccer Club
City Rangers Soccer Club
Croydon Cougars SSC
Eleven Adult
Elizabeth Downs
Elizabeth Grove
Elizabeth Vale
Flinders University SC
Gawler Soccer Club
Ghan United
Gleeson
Green United Soccer Club
Hahndorf
Ingle Farm Soccer Club
Kilburn Star
Kingston FC
Macedonia United Lions
Maiwand Soccer Club
Mawson Lakes
Mclaren DISTRICTS
Messinian Association Hawks
Modbury Jets Amateur
Modbury Jets Old Boys
Modbury Vista
Monarchs
Mssc Blue Eagles
Mu Stars
Munno Para City
Murray Bridge United
Noarlunga United
Northern Pitbulls
Northern Wolves
Old Ignatians
One Tree Hill
Para Hills East
Para Hills Lions
Para Hills Utd
Para Hills West
Parafield Gardens
Payneham Postel United
Plympton Bulldogs
Polonia
Pontian Eagles
Prince Alfred
Punjab Lions Soccer Club
Sa Centrals
Salisbury Florina
Salisbury International
Salisbury United Soccer Club
Salisbury Villa
Savoy
Seaford Amateur
South Coast United
Southern Breakers
Southern Knights
St Peters Old Collegians
Stirling District
Strathalbyn Strikers
Sturt Marion Thunder
Tea Tree Gully City
Torrens Valley
Ukrainian Sports Club Lion
Unley United
West Adelaide Raptors Soccer Club
West Beach
Westwood Football Club

Footnotes

See also
Association football in Australia

External links
FootballNews SA

 
Sou